European route E 592 is a European B class road in Russia, connecting the cities Krasnodar and Dzhubga.

Route 
 
: Krasnodar - Dzhubga

External links 
 UN Economic Commission for Europe: Overall Map of E-road Network (2007)
 International E-road network

E592